Lewton is a surname. Notable people with the name include:

Frederick Lewis Lewton (1874–1959), American botanist and museum curator
Steve Lewton (born 1983), English professional golfer
Val Lewton (1904–1951), Russian-American novelist, film producer and screenwriter
Val Lewton (visual artist) (1937–2015), American painter and museum exhibition designer

Other uses:
Lewton (Discworld), a fictional character in the Discworld novel series

See also
Lawton (surname)